Oleg Bejenar (transliterated: Oleh Valeriyovych Bezhenar, ; 17 September 1971 – 13 February 2023) was a Moldovan-Ukrainian professional football manager and footballer. 

Bejenar held UEFA PRO manager licence, given by Moldovan Football Federation.

Bejenar died from a heart attack on 13 February 2023, at the age of 51.

References

External links
 
 

1971 births
2023 deaths
Footballers from Kyiv
Soviet footballers
Moldovan footballers
Association football defenders
Moldovan expatriate footballers
Expatriate footballers in Ukraine
Expatriate footballers in Russia
Expatriate footballers in Uzbekistan
Moldovan expatriate sportspeople in Ukraine
Moldovan expatriate sportspeople in Russia
Moldovan expatriate sportspeople in Uzbekistan
FC Tighina players
CS Tiligul-Tiras Tiraspol players
FC Metalurh Novomoskovsk players
FC Arsenal Tula players
FC Nasaf players
Moldovan football managers
FC Academia Chișinău managers
FC Zimbru Chișinău managers
FC Dacia Chișinău managers
FC Dinamo-Auto Tiraspol managers
FC Akzhayik managers
Moldovan Super Liga managers
Moldovan expatriate football managers
Expatriate football managers in Armenia
Moldovan expatriate sportspeople in Armenia
Expatriate football managers in Kazakhstan
Moldovan expatriate sportspeople in Kazakhstan